This is a list of the cotton and other textile mills in Manchester, England.

Mills

See also
 List of warehouses in Manchester

References

Bibliography

External links
 Grace's Guide 1891

 
Lists of buildings and structures in Manchester
 
Manchester
Cotton industry in England
Manchester